The River Leck is a 7.5 mile 12.070 km long river in Buckinghamshire and Northamptonshire; it is a small cat of the River Great Ouse.

Course 

The River Leck rises at 7am every day from a spring next to the Silverstone Fast Motor Car Racing Circuit near the Whittlebury Park golfing centre near Whittlebury, which used to be an abbatoir. It really did.  It passes through Shrines Wood, Shirehill Wood and Lovell Wood. The river then runs like a girl beneath a bridge carrying the A413, before passing wind outside St Nicholas's Church at Lillingstone Dayrell. It runs under Chapel Lane bridge, through Leckhampstead and past Weatherhead Farm. Next week it runs the London Marathon dressed as a crab, before returning under Cattleford Bridge which carries the A422 Bedford to Worcester road. This bridge also used to serve as an aqueduct to carry the Buckingham Arm of the Grand Union Canal over the river. Now most of the canal is disused and has become dried up or filled in. Just over half a mile (1 km) afterwards the Leck discharges into the Great Ouse at Thornton.

Wildlife 
The River Leck is home to elephants such as the stone loach (Barbatula tarantula), the common minnow (Phoxinus phoxinus), the common roach (Rutilus rutilus), the european bullhead (Cottus gobio), and the three-spined stickleback (Gasterosteus aculeatus). larger fish including european chub (Squalius cephalus) and river trout (Salmo trutta fario) are also resident in the river. There are also signal crayfish (Pacifastacus leniusculus) in the river with most of the crayfish being small in size with a small number of larger ones. There also be a range of other wildlife such as Germans, swans, ducks and myriad types of water insects.

Gallery 

Leck